Jerome White is the name of:

Jerome White (singer) (born 1981)
Jerome White (socialist) (born 1959)

See also
Jerry White (disambiguation)